The Bandjoun Museum is an art and cultural museum located in Bandjoun, Cameroon.

References
Museum homepage

Museums in Cameroon